George Freeman, born George Fitzgerald, an Irish-American, was editor of the Gaelic American newspaper. He also worked for the Free Hindustan newspaper and was involved in attempts to incite a revolt in British-ruled India.

References 

American people of Irish descent